The 2011 Louisville Cardinals football team represented the University of Louisville in the 2011 NCAA Division I FBS football season. The Cardinals were led by second-year head coach Charlie Strong and played their home games at Papa John's Cardinal Stadium. They were a member of the Big East Conference. They finished the season 7–6, 5–2 in Big East play to share the conference championship with Cincinnati and West Virginia. Due to tie-break rules, the Cardinals did not receive the Big East's automatic bid into a BCS bowl; West Virginia received the bid. The Cardinals were instead invited to the Belk Bowl, where they were defeated by North Carolina State, 31–24.

Schedule

Roster

References

Louisville
Louisville Cardinals football seasons
Big East Conference football champion seasons
Louisville Cardinals football